Ethelbert is a former provincial electoral division in Manitoba, Canada.  It was created for the 1920 provincial election, and abolished with the 1958 election.

Ethelbert was located in Manitoba's mid-northern region, north of Dauphin.  It included a large Ukrainian population, and all four of the provincial representatives who were elected for this constituency were of Ukrainian descent.  Nicholas Hryhorczuk held Ethelbert for all but five years between 1920 and 1945, and his son Michael N. Hryhorczuk represented it from 1949 until its dissolution. For most of its existence, elections there were deferred until a few weeks after the rest of the province voted due to the logistical difficulty of running a campaign in the north.

After its elimination, parts of Ethelbert came to be included in the new division of Ethelbert Plains.

Provincial representatives

Former provincial electoral districts of Manitoba